The Herefordshire Wildlife Trust (formally Herefordshire Nature Trust) is a wildlife trust covering the county of Herefordshire, England.

References

External links 
 Herefordshire Wildlife Trust website

Wildlife Trusts of England